The Wichita Falls Diablos were a professional indoor football team that played in the American Professional Football League during the 2008 season. They were based out of Wichita Falls, Texas but originally scheduled to play only road games.

The Diablos Head coach was Chris Abrego. Players of note were:

Garyle Graham (AF2) 
Keith Clay (AF2) 
Prescott Hill (NIFL) 
Mark Ricker (NIFL)
Kelly Hancock (AF2)

The Diablos opened up the 2008 season with a loss to the Beaumont Drillers

Season-By-Season

|-
|*2008 || 2 || 4 || 0 || 4th Southern || --

* = Current Standing

References

American Professional Football League teams